State Route 234 (SR 234) is a  north–south state highway in McNairy County, Tennessee, connecting the town of Ramer with the community of Chewalla and the state of Mississippi. SR 234 is known as Chewalla Road between Ramer and Chewalla and as Wenasoga Road between Chewalla and Mississippi.

Route description

SR 234 begins at the Mississippi state line, where the roadway continues into the state as Alcorn County Road 700 (CR 700). It winds its way west then north as Wenasoga Road to pass through the community of Chewalla, where it becomes Chewalla Road at an intersection with Chewalla Street. The highway then passes northeast through farmland to enter Ramer, where it comes to an end at an intersection with SR 57. The entire route of SR 234 is a two-lane highway.

Major intersections

References

234
Transportation in McNairy County, Tennessee